Naba Kumar Chatterjee was an Indian politician belonging to All India Trinamool Congress. He was elected as a member of West Bengal Legislative Assembly from Memari in 1972. He joined All India Trinamool Congress from Indian National Congress on 14 March 2015. He died on 22 August 2015 at the age of 71.

References

1940s births
2015 deaths
Trinamool Congress politicians from West Bengal
West Bengal MLAs 1972–1977